Amma Ariyan is a 1986 Malayalam-language experimental film directed by avant-garde filmmaker John Abraham. The story revolves around the incidents following the death of a young Naxalite, upon whose death his friends travel to the village where his mother lives to inform her of the death of her only son.

Amma Ariyan is considered to be a complex movie and was one of the biggest experiments in Indian cinema when funds were raised to make a film without giving the slightest heed to its commercial viability. Since its release in 1986, critics have read several layers of meaning in its story. The film was the only South Indian film to feature on British Film Institute's Top 10 Indian Films list.

Plot

Preparing to leave for Delhi, Purushan bids his mother goodbye, promising to write to her regularly. In the thinly populated forest area of Wayanad in northeast Kerala, the jeep in which he is traveling is stopped by the Police, who take possession of it to carry a dead body found hanging on the wayside tree. The dead man's face looks familiar to Purushan. He becomes restless and is seized with a pathological obsession to find out the identity of the deceased. Against the wishes of his girlfriend, he abandons his trip to Delhi and sets out to seek his friends who may have some clue. Purushan meets journalist friends, doctors, and finally a veteran comrade, fondly addressed as Balettan who identifies the dead as the fellow musician who accompanied Satyajit, the guitarist. Satyajit confirms the deceased is his friend Hari, the tabla player. Together they decide to inform Hari's mother who stays in Cochin. They set out on a long eventful journey from the northern highlands of Wayanad to the Southern port city of Cochin.

As they move from Kozhikode to Beypore, Kodungalloor, Thrissur, Kottapuram, Vypin, and finally to Fort Kochi, the group swells as they meet many mothers and their sons and relatives who have known Hari; some had known him as a tabla player, some as Tony, the jazz drummer, and others as a silent political activist, a victim of police brutality, and a loner. And for others, he was a drug addict and one who used to drown his sorrow and pain in his music. Through their recollections, Hari's rather diffused identity unfolds. His classmates remember Hari as an introvert, weak and indecisive. His worker comrades identify him as a staunch revolutionary with strong resistance and willpower. But then what went wrong?

The colonial past of the places, what they took from us and what they left behind as well as the people's protests and uprisings, the region witnesses, and their heroes and victims are integrated into the narrative, by way of information as well as critique.

While reporting to his mother about Hari and his friends and their mothers on his southbound journey, John also reconstructs the history of the land through a series of class struggles, student protests, and workers union clashes that took place in the region where Purushan traversed. Starting with the medical students agitation against commercialization of medical  education, to a short dialogue with  Karuppuswamy, the unfortunate victim who had lost both his legs in a colliery workers struggle for better wages and human dignity, in Kottapuram, to Vypin island where several mazdoors (labourers) either died or lost their eyesight in the man-made hooch tragedy, to the Citizens group's forcible taking over of rice and sugar hoarded by unscrupulous black marketer traders and distributing to ordinary people at fair prices and giving back the money collected to the traders, to the manipulated fight between workers of two feuding unions in a Mattancherry street in Fort Kochi, where four fishermen had died, and also some targeted working-class leaders in a fake Police encounter, an abortive factory workers strike extending solidarity to the retrenched women workers in Fort Kochi, are some of the long list of peoples  protests and struggles reported with deep concern and feeling by Purushan in a long letter to his Mother.

As Purushan and his group wait for Hari's mother to come out of the Baptism ceremony from the church, they analyze their own past, noting the emerging debate focusing on the romantic evasions and tragic failures of the extremist movement. When Hari's mother finally turns up and faces the youth congregation, she asks "Suicide wasn't it?"  The film ends with Purushan's mother watching Hari's mother wiping her tear.

Cast
Kunhulakshmi Amma as Purushan's mother
Harinarayan as Hari
Joy Mathew as Purushan
Maji Venkitesh as Paru
Nilambur Balan

Production
The incidents that led to the production of Amma Ariyan are striking. A group of young friends of John Abraham who wanted to make it into a "people's movie", constituted the Odessa Collective, aiming at production and exhibition of good cinema with active participation of the general public, without the intervention of market forces.

They raised money for the film by traveling from village to village and house to house, beating drums, singing and putting up skits and short plays at street corners and asking for contributions for the 'people's cinema'. They collected the fund needed for the production of a movie. It was Odessa's first film and John's last Amma Ariyan re-wrote all the conventions of filmmaking.

The film is made in a documentary style. As a part of the technique of intertwining fact and fiction, the filmmaker shot many actual leftist political strikes that took place in Kerala during that time.

Themes

The Great Mother not one but many 
As in all primitive cultures which have the power to overcome contradictions of faith, in Kerala too radicalism has gone hand in hand with the mother cult. The mother goddess is worshipped in its varied forms – as Devi, Bhagavathi, Parvathi, and Kali all alternate forms of Durga, the consort of Lord Shiva and the embodiment of energy and destruction.  The traditional matrilineal kinship, sensitively shown in the scene between the mother and the son's betrothed drying the wet cloth in the sun, waypoints to the strong influence Purushan (The Man)  has in defining his personal radicalism. The male (Purushan) seeking an umbilical solace in the female (Nature) through the expression of his inner self thereby becomes the crux of John's narrative. "Suicide  is something that John tries to come to grips with as the little boy asks: "Father, what's suicide?"  And Purushan clumsily tries to explain but fails

Two mothers in the film - one Hindu and the other Muslim - ask themselves and us, "Why these youngsters are committing suicide? ", As we look at their faces, we realize John is not telling the story of one mother and one son but of several mothers and several sons and also the tragedy of a time in Kerala's socio-political and cultural history. As with Ghatak, for John also the mother image is the most vibrant cohesive force in Nature which binds people of different sensitivity together. His protagonist s journey begins and ends with the same belief.

Alone in the crowd 
As the journey proceeds and Purushan takes stock of his life and goes into reflections of his umbilical links with his mother and the beloved as they always appear together as a single entity in his mind,  he finds himself more and more alienated from the group and their ideology, (if they have one). The alienation becomes complete towards the fag end of the film with an arresting image of him lying alone in a bed of flowers under a tree and the camera captures his face in a way that reminds us of the dead face of Hari in the mortuary His total identification with Hari takes him to come to terms with himself and both the mothers ¦.

The Journey 
The whole film is designed in the form of a "journey" – the journey of life Putrushan sets out for the journey with the intention of going  North (Delhi), but after his encounter with "death" he reverses the direction and travels South from the forests of Vayanad in North Kerala to Fort Kochi, the port city, traversing practically the whole of Malabar, a land which had a long tradition of political activity and people's movements in Kerala. Even though John came from further down, Kottayam, he seemed to have a thorough grasp of the political and cultural history of this region. The film is an eloquent testimony to this.

History of class struggles 
While reporting to his mother about Hari and his friends and their mothers on his southbound journey, John also reconstructs the history of the land through a series of class struggles, student protests, and workers union clashes that took place in the region where Purushan traversed. Starting with the medical students' agitation against the commercialization of medical education (a topical issue to this day), to a short dialogue with Karuppuswamy, the unfortunate victim who had lost both his legs in colliery worker's struggle for better wages and human dignity, in Kottapuram, to Vypin island where several mazdoors (laborers) either died or lost their eyesight in the man-made hooch tragedy, to the citizens group's forcible taking over of rice and sugar hoarded by unscrupulous black marketer traders and distributing to ordinary people at fair prices and giving back the money collected to the traders, to the manipulated fight between workers of two feuding unions in a Mattancherry street in Fort Kochi. Where four fishermen had died, and also some targeted working-class leaders in a fake Police encounter, abortive factory workers' strike extending solidarity to the retrenched women workers in Fort Kochi ¦ are some of the long lists of people's protests and struggles reported with deep concern and feeling by Purushan in a long letter to his Mother ¦

Interpreting metaphors 
The metaphors used by John in Amma Ariyan are powerful, but often obscure. The dead body, which Purushan witnessed by chance and later, brings together like-minded people to form a crowd requires to be interpreted. The other and perhaps the most important metaphor that needs interpretation is 'Mother'. Even though throughout the course of the film, each individual member joins the crowd after informing their respective mothers, two mothers stand out in the film. The film unfurls in the form of a letter to Purushan's mother who sees off her son by urging him to write a letter to her, wherever he may be. The other mother, the mother of Hari who commits suicide is the destination of the crowd. While one among them is anxious to know about her son's journey through the torrid times, the other mother foresees her son's suicide, while almost all the mothers are seen worried about the youth of that time, succumbing to suicide. John's film starts with a mother's wish to know about her son and ends where another mother's dreams of her son burn down. The crowd that is formed for the mission of informing Hari's mother about his death too requires interpretation.

References

External links
 
 Amma Ariyan - Cinema Of Malayalam
 Amma Ariyan, a study - Manuvilsan, Rajmohan
 John Abraham - Profile in cinemaofmalayalam.net
 John Abraham - Weblokam profile
 A tribute to Ritwik Ghatak by John

1980s avant-garde and experimental films
1980s Malayalam-language films
Indian avant-garde and experimental films
Films directed by John Abraham
Films whose cinematographer won the Best Cinematography National Film Award
Crowdfunded films